Kamala Wijeratne is an educationist in the field of English, short story writer, and poet from Sri Lanka. She has received many awards including State Literary Awards and the Sahithya Ratna lifetime award, which is the highest honor given to Sri Lankans who have made an outstanding contribution to Sri Lankan Literature.

Biography
Wijeratne was born on 15 August 1939 in Ulapane, a village near Kandy in Sri Lanka. After her early education at Teldeniya, she graduated from St. Scholasticus College, Kandy in 1955 and from Madya Maha Vidyalaya, Gampola in 1958. She then attended University of Peradeniya (now University of Ceylon), where she studied English, Sinhala, and economics. After graduation in 1962 and acquiring a Post Graduate Diploma, she received her Masters in Arts in Education (MEd) from the University of Ceylon, Peradeniya. In 1992 she obtained her second Master in Arts in Teaching English to Speakers of Other Languages (TESOL) from the University of Edinburgh.

Wijeratne started her career as a teacher and joined as a lecturer at the Teacher's College, Peradeniya and later joined the National Institute of Education as a Chief Project Officer. She retired from service in 1999, and currently  works as a visiting lecturer at the Faculty of Education at University of Colombo and the Department of English at University of Sri Jayawardhanapura.

While she started writing in her teens, Wijeratne's professional writing began in 1983 with the publication of her first poetry collection Smell of Araliya. She writes about aspects of Sri Lankan culture, some of her poems reflect women's inner feelings in Sri Lankan culture. Some of her poems are an expression of her resentment of war and violence in Sri Lanka and its repercussion on the lives of civilians.

Literary works

Poetry collection
The Smell of Araliya (1983)
A house Divided (1985) – Poems dealing with the internal violence and the widening gap between ethnic groups in Sri Lanka
The Disinherited (1986)- A reaction to the violence of 1988 – 1990
That One Talent (1987)- Reaction to the continuing violence and the social upheavals of the 90's
The White Saree and Other Poems- Sensitive reaction to the violence of the North and South. (1988)
Millenium Poems (2002)- Deals with a variety of issues ; war, pollution, corruption, love and death. It received State literary prize
A Prayer to God Upulwan (2007)- Sensitive reaction to the Tsunami of 2004, ethnic misunderstanding, legend and myth.
The Other Trojan Woman (2014)
My Green Book (2015)
Impressions (2017)

Short story collection
Death by Drowning and Other Stories (1998)-  Short stories that deal with various themes like development, charge, women's issues etc.
Ten Stories (2012)
The Potted Plant (2014)

Awards
2002 – State Literary Award for Poetry collection
2012 – State Literary Award for the Best Anthology of Short Stories
2012 – Godage award for the best collection of short stories
2014 – State Literary Award for the Best Anthology of Short Stories
2014 – Godage award for the Best Collection of Short stories
2019 – Sahitya Ratna lifetime achievements award
2019 – Award from the National Institute of Education, Maharagam at the National RESC conference (2019)

Personal life
In 1966 she married Rankondegedara Wijeratne, who was a Deputy Director of Small Industries in Kandy. They have three children.

References

Sri Lankan women poets
Living people
1939 births
People from Kandy District
People from British Ceylon